Yeh Zindagi Ka Safar is a 2001 Bollywood romantic drama film, directed by Tanuja Chandra and produced by Mukesh Bhatt. The film stars Jimmy Sheirgill and Ameesha Patel. The film released on November 16, 2001.

Synopsis 

20-year-old Sarena's world is picture-perfect — she has an adorable relationship with her industrialist father Vivek Devan  and is on the verge of major stardom as a pop singer. Jai Bhardwaj's world is poles apart. As the struggling editor of a near-bankrupt Hindi tabloid "Aadarsh Times", he dreams of one day having an office in pricey Nariman Point. He searches for a sensational story that'll get him there.

Through Municipal clerk Ganpat, Jai stumbles upon the secret that pop star Sarena is not the real daughter of industrialist Vivek Devan, who had taken great pains to ensure that no one knew she was adopted. Jai realizes that this could be the story he was looking for and goes ahead and publishes it, thus incurring the wrath of Vivek Devan. Even the tabloid owner Dada is upset with Jai and disapproves of his idea of unraveling the truth. An enraged Vivek Devan takes legal action against the tabloid by sending defamation notice for Rupees five crores and he also tries to suppress any further information being leaked. Sarena, however, notices her father's anxiety and confronts him, only to discover that Jai, despite his crude ways of going about it, had written the truth. Ignoring her father's protests, Sarena goes in search of her real mother. At every stage, her companion in her mission is Jai, who follows her through the journey from Mumbai to Ooty to get the legal notice withdrawn.

With no headway in her search, Sarena seeks Jai's help, inspired by his go-getting ways. As Sarena discovers layer upon devastating layer of truth behind her identity, Jai too learns many things about life. On the trip, they fall in love. When Sarena meets her mother Sister Namrata, she is glad, but her mother doesn't seem pleased. She rejects Sarena by stating that she doesn't have a daughter. It turns out that Sarena's mother was raped by a police officer and Sarena was the product of that disastrous event. Horrified by the truth, Sarena teams up with Jai to undo the injustice done to her mother. All ends well, as Sarena's mother comes to Mumbai to testify against her rapist police officer. She is able to get justice and the police officer, who is none other than the Police Commissioner Prashant Marwah, gets arrested. He creates a ruckus in the Court during the hearing and walks out challenging the Judge, who orders his police remand for 10 days. Outside the courtroom, Prashant shoots himself, unable to bear the humiliation. Sarena's mother returns to Ooty while Sarena and Jai get married eventually and Jai manages to fulfill his dream of having his office in Nariman Point.

Cast 
Jimmy Sheirgill as Jai Bharadwaj
Ameesha Patel as Sarena Devan
Nafisa Ali as Sister Namrata
Gulshan Grover as Vivek Devan
Ehsaan Khan as Police Commissioner Prashant Marwah
Rajpal Yadav as Dada
Surendra Rajan as Father
Simran Rajiv Ghai as Little Girl

Soundtrack
The soundtrack album for the film was composed by Daboo Malik & Sajid–Wajid. 

"Ahista Ahista" song is composed by Sajid–Wajid

References

External links
 

2001 films
2000s Hindi-language films
Films directed by Tanuja Chandra